Stuff, the Chinatown Kid is a DC Comics fictional character, a sidekick to the original Vigilante. He first appeared in Action Comics #45 (February 1942).

In American Comic Book Chronicles: 1940-1944, Kurt Mitchell and Roy Thomas say that "Stuff the Chinatown Kid was a refreshing change from the usual antiquated stereotypes of Chinese-Americans, since he spoke perfect, albeit slang-filled English and acted like any other red-blooded American kid sidekick".

Fictional character biography
Jimmy Leong is the grandson of Lin Chou, leader of the White Lotus tong in New York's Chinatown. Jimmy assists the Vigilante when a Japanese spy known as the Head frames his grandfather for provoking a Tong war. Jimmy becomes the Vigilante's sidekick "Stuff, the Chinatown Kid". While with the Vigilante, he fought the Pecos Kid, the Rainbow Man and the Dummy.

After Jimmy is killed (see below), his younger brother Victor becomes the new Chinatown Kid. In contrast to his brother's Western attire, Victor wears traditional Chinese garb. Later as an adult, Victor assists the now-retired Greg Saunders (the Vigilante's alter ego) in running his chain of Western-themed restaurants. Saunders and Stuff annually invite Pat Dugan (Stripesy) and his family for Christmas, despite the Dugans' failure to take them up on their offer.  

Jimmy is deceased as of the present time. His murder has been credited to two separate killers: The Dummy killed him in World's Finest #246 (August-September 1977). After the reality alteration caused by the Crisis on Infinite Earths, mobster Bugsy Siegel is shown to have killed him in the mini-series Vigilante: City Lights, Prairie Justice (1995-1996).

Powers and abilities
Both Jimmy and Victor Leong have no superpowers but are proficient martial artists in judo and hapkido as well as several kung-fu techniques.

In other media
Stuff appears in the 1947 15-chapter serial The Vigilante: Fighting Hero of the Old West, portrayed by George Offerman, Jr. In this appearance, Stuff is a thirty-something Caucasian, rather than an Asian teenager.

References

External links
 About the first one on dcuguide.com
 About the second one on dcuguide.com
 Another entry about both of them
 

Comics characters introduced in 1942
Characters created by Mort Weisinger
DC Comics sidekicks
DC Comics male superheroes
DC Comics martial artists
Chinese-American superheroes
Golden Age superheroes
Chinese superheroes